Gulaba is a village in the State of Himachal Pradesh, India. It is 27  km away from Manali and 25 km from Rohtang pass. The village is designed and manned as per the guidelines of National Green Tribunal Act. Gulaba has all the relevant equipment and computerized system to ensure good tourism management. Gulaba has mobile toilets units and an effective waste disposal system.  As per the order of National Green Tribunal Act, permits are given to up to only 800 petrol vehicles and 400 diesel vehicles to visit Rohtang Pass.

The road leading to Rohtang Pass is barred during heavy snowfall season which lasts from November to March. To avoid accidents, Himachal Pradesh Police has set up barriers to guide traffic.
This place is considered to be a starting point to Brighu lake trekking. The area is filled with picturesque scenery and flora.

References 

Villages in Kullu district